Gaz may refer to:

Geography
Gaz, Kyrgyzstan

Iran
Gaz, Darmian, village in South Khorasan Province
Gaz, Golestan, a village in Bandar-e Gaz County
Gaz, Hormozgan, a village in Minab County
Gaz, Iran, a city in Isfahan Province
Gaz, Kerman, a village
Gaz, North Khorasan, a village
Gaz, Ravar, a village in Kerman Province
Gaz, Sarbisheh, village in South Khorasan Province
Gaz, Semnan, a village in Damghan County
Gaz-e Gharbi, a village in Bandar-e Gaz County, Golestan Province
Gaz-e Lang, a village in Anbarabad County, Kerman Province
Bandar-e-gaz County,  Golestan Province

People

Given name
Gaz Beadle (born 1988), TV actor in Geordie Shore
Gaz Coombes (born 1976), in the band Supergrass
Gaz Liddon, British games reviewer

Stage name
Gaz, former drummer of Malice Mizer and Baiser

Surname
Mohammad Al Gaz, UAE businessman

Arts, entertainment, and media

Fictional characters
Gaz (Call of Duty 4),  SAS soldier in the 2007 video game
Kyle "Gaz" Garrick, SAS operator in the 2019 video game Call of Duty: Modern Warfare
Gaz Membrane, from the animated television series Invader Zim
Gaz Bennett,  from UK soap opera Hollyoaks
Gaz Digzy, from the animated series Ballmastrz 9009
Gaz Wilkinson, in the sitcom Two Pints of Lager and a Packet of Crisps
Gary "Gaz" Schofield, in the 1997 British comedy The Full Monty

Businesses and brands
GAZ, the Russian automobile manufacturer Gorkovsky Avtomobilny Zavod
GAZ-AA, GAZ-MM, GAZ-built Fords
Campingaz, bottled gas and paraphernalia previously known as Camping Gaz

Other uses
Gaz (candy), Isfahan, Iran
Gaz (measure) or Guz, Asian or Mughal unit of length

See also
Do Gaz Zameen Ke Neeche, 1972 Bollywood horror film directed by Tulsi Ramsay
Gaz de France Stars, tennis tournament held in Hasselt, Belgium
Gaz Khan, village in Badakhshan Province, Afghanistan
Les Gaz mortels, 1916 silent French film directed by Abel Gance
Saint-André-le-Gaz, Isère, France
Stadionul Inter Gaz, stadium in Popeşti-Leordeni, Romania
Stadionul Municipal Gaz Metan, stadium in Mediaş, Romania